Newsline was a Pakistani monthly English current affairs and political magazine owned by Hum Network. It was published from 1989 to 2019 in Karachi, Pakistan.

History
Newsline was started in July 1989. Razia Bhatti (1944 – 1996), a Pakistani journalist and former editor of the Herald, was the founder editor of the magazine. In 2014, the Hum Network acquired the magazine. In December 2019, it published its last issue and stopped publication citing "financial constraints" by the Hum Network.

See also
 List of magazines in Pakistan

References

External links
Official website

1989 establishments in Pakistan
2019 disestablishments in Pakistan
Defunct magazines published in Pakistan
Defunct political magazines
English-language magazines published in Pakistan
Hum Network Limited
Magazines established in 1989
Magazines disestablished in 2019
Mass media in Karachi
Monthly magazines published in Pakistan
News magazines published in Pakistan
Political magazines published in Pakistan